Bogdan Olegovich Mozgovoi (born 29 October 2000) is a Russian Paralympic swimmer. He represented Russian Paralympic Committee athletes at the 2020 Summer Paralympics.

Career
Mozgovoi represented Russian Paralympic Committee athletes at the 2020 Summer Paralympics where he won gold medals in the 100 metre breaststroke S9 event and men's 4 × 100 metre medley relay 34pts event.

References

2000 births
Living people
Paralympic swimmers of Russia
Medalists at the World Para Swimming European Championships
Medalists at the World Para Swimming Championships
Swimmers at the 2020 Summer Paralympics
Medalists at the 2020 Summer Paralympics
Paralympic medalists in swimming
Paralympic gold medalists for the Russian Paralympic Committee athletes
Sportspeople from Ufa
Russian male freestyle swimmers
Russian male backstroke swimmers
S9-classified Paralympic swimmers
21st-century Russian people